Cape Cod is a peninsula in southeastern Massachusetts.

Cape Cod may also refer to:
Cape Cod (house), an architectural style, originating in New England in the 17th century
Cape Cod style, an 1800s lighthouse design once typical of Cape Cod that today only exists on the U.S. West Coast 
Cape Cod National Seashore, a federally protected seashore in Massachusetts
"Old Cape Cod", a 1957 song popularized by Patti Page
Cape Codder (cocktail), an alcoholic beverage
 Cape Cod Potato Chips, an American potato chip brand

See also
Cape Codder (disambiguation)